Alberto Lim is a Filipino businessman. He was a former  Philippine Secretary of Tourism. On June 29, 2010, President Benigno Aquino III picked him as his Secretary of Tourism. He, however, quit his post on August 12, 2011, due to personal reasons.

Background
Before being appointed by Benigno Aquino III to the Tourism secretary post, Lim was the president of the Makati Business Club, a group known to support Aquino even before the latter's campaign started.

Tourism Secretary
He took over the helm of the Tourism Department from Joseph Ace Durano. Early speculations also pointed to showbiz talk host Boy Abunda as the new head of the Department of Tourism (DOT) but Abunda declined the post. In appointing Lim, Aquino said: Tourism is seen as one of the key venues for increasing jobs in the country. We need someone who has proven competence in this field".

After 2010 Manila hostage crisis ended in blood, Lim was appointed with Soliman by the president "to provide everything necessary for the recovery and return home of the survivors".  It is the first challenge faced by Lim after his appointment.

Lim was criticized for the tourism slogan Pilipinas Kay Ganda on the basis that foreigners did not understand clearly what it meant even though these people were the supposed object of the campaign message. Many notable people asked for his resignation until he finally decided to resign in August 2011.

References

 

Living people
21st-century Filipino businesspeople
Secretaries of Tourism of the Philippines
Benigno Aquino III administration cabinet members
Year of birth missing (living people)
Filipino politicians of Chinese descent